Sonny Gordon (born July 30, 1965) is a former American football defensive back. He played for the Tampa Bay Buccaneers in 1987, the Hamilton Tiger-Cats from 1989 to 1990 and for the Saskatchewan Roughriders in 1991.

References

1965 births
Living people
American football defensive backs
Ohio State Buckeyes football players
Tampa Bay Buccaneers players
Hamilton Tiger-Cats players
Saskatchewan Roughriders players